Tulcea County is a county (județ) of Romania, in the historical region Dobruja, with the capital city at Tulcea. It includes in its northeast corner the large and thinly-populated estuary of the Danube.

Demographics 

In 2011, Tulcea County had a population of 201,462. The population density was 23.7/km², the lowest among the counties of Romania, due to the inclusion within the area of the lowly-populated Danube estuarial wetlands.

 Romanians - 89.13%
 Lipovans - 5.41%
 Turks - 0.93%
 Romani - 1.87%
 Greeks - 0.65%

In the Danube Delta there is an important community of Russians and Lipovans. In the south of the county there are communities of Turks. The region once was a centre of Islam in Romania.

Geography

The most significant feature of Tulcea County is the Danube Delta, which occupies about 1/3 of the entire surface and is located in the North-East side of the county. The Delta has three main branches: the Sulina branch (the only one navigable by large ships) in the middle, the Chilia branch in the North (the border with Ukraine) and the Sfântu Gheorghe branch (Saint George) in the South.

In the South-East of the county there are two lagoons: Razelm Lake and Sinoe Lake. In the Danube Delta and in the South—in the area between the Sfântu Gheorghe Channel and Razelm Lake—there are countless channels and small lakes. The entire area is included in the UNESCO list of World Heritage Sites and Biosphere reserves.

The Danube River flows around the county in the West and North side. In the West, there is the Măcin Branch which flows on the East side of the Great Brăila Island. From Smârdan (on the opposite side from Brăila) to Pătlăgeanca (close to Tulcea), the Danube has only one big flow of water, around which there are an immense number of lakes and small channels.

In the center of the county, there is the Casincea Plateau and the Măcin Mountains—the remains of a prehistorical mountains range (more than 400 million years old), with the greatest height at about 400 m.

Neighbours

 Black Sea in the East.
 Brăila County in the West.
 Galați County in the North-West
 Ukraine in the North - the Odessa Oblast.
 Constanța County in the South.

Economy
Agriculture and fishing are the main occupations, involving about 48% of the population. Industry is concentrated in the large towns only.

The predominant industries in the county are:
 Food industry.
 Textile industry.
 Ship building industry.
 Metallurgy - aluminium.
 Chemical industry.
 Construction materials.

Tourism
Tourism is an important activity in the county, the Danube Delta being one of the most visited areas in Romania.

The main destinations for tourists are:
 The Danube Delta
 The town of Sulina—the last town on the Danube.
 The areas around Sfântu Gheorghe, Mahmudia, Crișan, Caraorman, Chilia Veche.
 The city of Tulcea.
 The Roman fort of Halmyris.

Politics 

The Tulcea County Council, renewed at the 2020 local elections, consists of 30 counsellors, with the following party composition:

Administrative divisions

Tulcea County has 1 municipality, 4 towns and 46 communes.
Municipalities
 Tulcea - capital city; population: 73,707 (as of 2011)
Towns

Communes

Historical county

Historically, the county was located in the southeastern part of Greater Romania, in the region of north Dobruja. The borders of the historic county coincide with those of the present county. It bordered on the west with Brăila County, northwest with Covurlui County, to the north with Ismail County, to the south by Constanța County, and to the east and south-east with the Black Sea.

Administration

The county was originally divided administratively into four districts (plăși):
Plasa Babadag, headquartered at Babadag
Plasa Gurile Dunării, headquartered at Tulcea
Plasa Măcin, headquartered at Măcin
Plasa Topolog, headquartered at Topolog

As in the present day there were five towns (cities): Tulcea (county headquarters), Babadag, Măcin, Isaccea and Sulina.

Population 

According to the 1930 census data, the county population was 184,038 inhabitants, ethnically divided as follows: 62.6% Romanians, 12.2% Russians, 10.6% Bulgarians, 2.5% Turks, 1.7% Greeks, 1.3% Germans, as well as other minorities. From the religious point of view, the population was 85.8% Eastern Orthodox, 8.3% Old-Rite Lipovan Orthodox, 2.8% Muslim, 1.5% Roman Catholic, 0.6% Lutheran, as well as other minorities.

Urban population 
In 1930, the county's urban population was 41,632 inhabitants, comprising 64.7% Romanians, 12.8% Russians, 5.5% Turks, 4.4% Greeks, 3.3% Bulgarians, 2.5% Jews, 0.8% Germans, as well as other minorities. Mother tongues among the urban population were Romanian (69.4%), followed by Russian (15.0%), Turkish (5.5%), Greek (3.9%), Yiddish (1.5%), as well as other minorities. From the religious point of view, the urban population was composed of 87.5% Eastern Orthodox, 5.7% Muslim, 2.6% Jewish, 1.9% Roman Catholic, as well as other minorities.

References

External links

 
Counties of Romania
1879 establishments in Romania
1938 disestablishments in Romania
1940 establishments in Romania
1950 disestablishments in Romania
1968 establishments in Romania
States and territories established in 1879
States and territories disestablished in 1938
States and territories established in 1940
States and territories disestablished in 1950
States and territories established in 1968